Hauwa Allahbura is a Nollywood actress and film producer. She is the CEO of Cut24 Productions and she has produced and directed several films including Gidi Blues (2016) The Eve (2018), and Code Wilo (2019). She is the founder of Pull Up Naija, a group that is sensitizing the Nigerian youth on the modus operandi of participating actively in the election process.

Early life and education 
She was born in Lagos State into a family of  customs officers. Because of the nature of her father's job, she attended primary schools in three different places; the Crescent International School, Lagos; the Crescent International School, Kano; and the French International School, Badagry.  For her secondary school,  she attended the Police Secondary School, Minna, Niger State; and Federal Government College, Ilorin, Kwara State.  She obtained her first degree in History and international Studies from Nasarawa State University, Keffi. She is also a graduate of London Film Academy; New York State University, and Montana State University.

Career 
Allahbura started her acting career as a True TV presenter. She went for audition and she was selected to join the Mnet Family TV on DSTV  she was playing the character of Maro in Tinsel. Since then, she has featured and produced different movies including Battle Ground: African Magic, Las Gidi Vice, Gidi Blues (2016) The Eve (2018), Code Wilo (2019).  She encourages youth to partake in the forthcoming 2023 Nigerian general election.

Filmography 
 Gidi Blues (2016)
 The Eve (2018)

References 

Living people
20th-century Nigerian actresses
Nigerian film directors
21st-century Nigerian actresses
Nasarawa State University alumni
Montana State University alumni
Year of birth missing (living people)
Nigerian film actresses
Nigerian film producers
State University of New York alumni
Nigerian television presenters
Nigerian chief executives
Nigerian television actresses
Nigerian television personalities
Nigerian businesspeople
Nigerian women in business